The TRAM-EM European Tramdriver Championship is the European championship for competitive tram driving.

History 
In 2012, the first Tram-EM (German: Tram-Europameisterschaft, or Tram European Championship) was created for the 140th anniversary of the Dresden tram network. The championship is hosted yearly in Europe by rotating local transit companies in cooperation with the Dresden-based production company that created the concept.

TRAM-EM has been a registered trademark since 2014.

Concept 
The Tram-EM competition is a team competition where each team consists of one female tram driver, one male tram driver and one team supervisor. The competition is open to European public transport agencies, who may submit one team each.

The championship is split into two rounds, with each driver taking the wheel once. Each round consists of 6 disciplines. The disciplines could be stopping at a target, emergency braking, measuring side clearance during a curve, stopping exactly at a tram stop, speed estimation with a hidden speedometer, precision driving past a gate, "tram billiards," or "tram bowling." The skill at each discipline, in addition to the time to complete each discipline, influences the score. The event includes a team procession, practice rounds, social events for drivers, competition, and award ceremony.

The competitions have long been tied-in to public celebrations of the hosting transit agency, such as the 140th anniversary of the Dresden tram network, the 10th anniversary of the Barcelona tram network, and the 150th anniversary of the Viennese tram network. The goal of the competition is to give tram operators an international platform to share experience.

Past events 

* originally postponed due to the COVID-19 pandemic, but eventually cancelled

References

External links 
 TRAM-EM Website
Tram transport in Europe
Annual events in Europe
2012 establishments in Europe